, also known as Tragedy of Japan, is a 1953 Japanese drama film written and directed by Keisuke Kinoshita.    The film tells the story of a mother who has to raise two children during and after World War II, but whose children reject her. Kinoshita interspersed newsreel footage within the film in an attempt to relate the story of the film to the wider context of Japan's post-war difficulties.

Plot
War widow Haruke, mother of two children, gets involved in prostitution during and after the Second World War to raise money for the family and secure the children a proper education. Her son Seiichi and daughter Utako, sharing a flat of their own, are embarrassed by their mother's activities and reluctant to her visits. Eager to cut ties with his past and poor upbringing, Seiichi, a medical student, aims at being adopted by an upper-class family. His sister Utako studies dressmaking and attends an English language school, engaging with her married teacher. Eventually, Seiichi's plan fulfils, while Utako, who claims that she can't lead a normal relationship after being raped by a cousin as a child, evokes a marital crisis. When Haruke finally realises that she has lost both her children, she commits suicide.

Cast
 Yūko Mochizuki as Haruko Inoue
 Yōko Katsuragi as Utako, Haruko's daughter
 Masumi Taura as Seiichi, Haruko's son
 Teiji Takahashi as Sato
 Keiji Sada as Tatsuya, a street musician
 Ken Uehara as Masayuki Akazawa, the English teacher
 Sanae Takasugi as Mrs. Akazawa
 Keiko Awaji as Wakamaru, a geisha

Reception
Alexander Jacoby regarded the personal conflict between the mother and her selfish children to be more "vivid" than the wider context provided by the newsreels.

Isolde Standish points out that the newsreels give credence to the "subjective memories" of the characters that are shown in the film's flashback scenes. For example, newsreel footage of American soldiers cavorting with Japanese women foreshadow a flashback scene depicting Haruko's decision to become a prostitute. The flashbacks also provide contexts for the family's present day misunderstandings, when Haruko gets involved in the black market to provide food for the family, but her son Seiichi only knows that the activity causes him embarrassment at school, or when the children's cruel uncle tells them that their mother is enjoying herself at the Atami hot springs, while she is working as a prostitute to raise money for the family.

According to film critic Donald Richie, A Japanese Tragedy was one of the first post-war films to focus on Japanese mothers, as Mikio Naruse's Repast was one of the first to focus on the plight of Japanese wives.

Awards
Kinoshita won both the Mainichi Film Award and Blue Ribbon Award for best screenplay in 1953. Yūko Mochizuki won the 1953 Mainichi Film Award for best actress.

References

External links

1953 films
1953 drama films
1950s Japanese-language films
Japanese black-and-white films
Films directed by Keisuke Kinoshita
Films with screenplays by Keisuke Kinoshita
Shochiku films
Japanese drama films
1950s Japanese films